32–36 Atholl Street is a three-property row of historic buildings on the northern side of Atholl Street in Perth, Scotland. Dating to the early 19th century, the building is Category C listed. The building appears on 1823 maps.

Perth Memorials, a subsidiary of Glasgow-based J. & G. Mossman Ltd., occupies number 36, at the corner of Stormont Street. The parent company was established in 1816, but it is not known when it moved into the building.

See also
List of listed buildings in Perth, Scotland

References

19th-century establishments in Scotland
Atholl Street 32-36
Category C listed buildings in Perth and Kinross